London Chargers R.L.F.C. are a rugby league side based in South West London who currently (2022) compete in the Southern Conference League, a tier 4 competition.  They were known as the South West London Chargers up until November 2015.  They were formed in 2013 as a merger between West London Sharks and South London Storm and formerly competed in the London Premier (South Premier)

History
South West London Chargers were formed on 17 January 2013 from the merger of South London Storm and West London Sharks.  The newly merged side was based in Clapham Common.

The club entered a team in the London Premier men's competition and a second men's team in the London Entry League.  The club ran a women's team in the South East England competition.

Chargers went on to win the London Premier and the Harry Jepson three years in a row - 2013 - 15.

In December 2015, the club announced a rebrand to 'London Chargers' and competed in the Conference League South, the highest level of amateur rugby league in the south of Britain.  Their A team moved up to the London Premier competition to replace the first team.  Chargers won the CLS in 2016, but after the season the CLS folded and Chargers had to go back to the London Premier.  In 2017 they made it to the London Premier final but lost to Hammersmith Hills Hoists.

In 2018 Chargers drew local long term rivals Hammersmith in the 1st round of the Challenge Cup and avenged the Grand Final defeat winning 18–0.  But in the London Premier season, Chargers once again came up just short against Hammersmith losing in the Grand Final.

In 2019 Chargers made the Grand Final of the newly formed Southern Conference League, once again against Hammersmith Hills Hoists. They drew 12-12 and won away 16–34 against the Hoists in the season. But when it came to the Grand Final, Chargers went down 16–10. The rivalry continues...

The 2020 season was cancelled due to COVID-19.

In 2021 Chargers made the Grand Final against Wests Warriors, but went down 20-10 in Rosslyn Park.

In 2022 Chargers made the Grand Final against Wests Warriors, however went down again in a nailbiter.

In 2023 Chargers will run two men's teams in the Southern Conference League and the London Premier League, whilst also moving taking occupancy at their new home ground at Kings House School in Chiswick. 

Chargers has run two men's teams since inception in 2013.

Founding members 
  Adam Tran
  Cameron Paul
  Craig Monteiro
  Damian Mohan
  Donny Lam
  John Paul Byrnes
  Mark Barnes
  Mark Clune
  Nathan Brown
  Rob McLean
  Ryan Massingham

Coaching and management staff 2023
 Head Coach:  Marty Hyde
 Team Manager:  Deon Stephenson
 Chairman:  Craig Monteiro
 Secretary:  Todd Peut
 Treasurer:  Jamie Park

Chairman
 2013 - 2017:   Cam Paul
 2018 - present:   Craig Monteiro

Head coach
 2013 - 2014:   Mark Barnes
 2015:   Richard Knight and  Kane Stannard
 2016 - 2017:   Mark Barnes
 2018 - 2021:   Todd Peut
 2022:   Mark Barnes
 2023:   Marty Hyde

Barnes-Paul (Club-man) award
 2013:  Craig Monteiro and  Mark Clune
 2014:  Mark Clune
 2015:  Paul Handley
 2016:  Paul Handley
 2017:  Joe Briggs
 2018:  Mike Butcher
 2019:  Mike Chivers
 2021:  James Jones

Club honours
 Conference League South: 2016
 South Premier Champions: 2013, 2014, and 2015 (three times)
 London and South East Cup: 2013 (one time)
 Harry Jepson Trophy: 2013, 2014, and 2015 (three times)
 South Premier Minor Premiers: 2014, and 2015
 Brighton 9's: 2014, and 2015 (two times)
 Challenge Cup: 2014 - Round 2, 2015 - Round 1, 2016 - Round 1, 2017 - Round 2, 2018 - Round 2, 2019 - Round 1, 2020 - Round 1
 London and South East Entry League Minor Premiers: 2013 (one time)
 London Rugby League "Club of the Year": 2014

Challenge Cup
 2014 Round 1: Torfaen Tigers (home) 12-6 W
 2014 Round 2: Milford Marlins (home) 6-24 L
 2015 Round 1: Widnes West Bank (away) 14-10 L
 2016 Round 1: Shaw Cross Sharks (home) 14-22 L
 2017 Round 1: Bridgend Blue Bulls (home) 116-0 W
 2017 Round 2: Fryston Warriors (home) 12-40 L
 2018 Round 1: Hammersmith Hills Hoists (home) 18-0 W
 2018 Round 2: Army (away) 24-16 L
 2019 Round 1: Wath Brow Hornets (home) 6-34 L
 2020 Round 1: Rochdale Mayfield (away) 32-12 L
 2021 - Amateur teams not entered due to COVID-19
 2022 Round 1: Ellenborough Rangers (home) 22-16 W
 2022 Round 2: London Skolars (away) 40-22 L
 2023 Round 1: North Herts Crusaders (home) 38 - 12 W
 2023 Round 2: Wests Warriors (away) 18 - 14 L

References

External links

Rugby League Conference teams
Rugby league teams in London
2013 establishments in England
Rugby clubs established in 2013